Wood Coaster (Chinese: 木质过山车), also known as Mountain Flyer (Chinese: 飞跃巅峰), is a wooden roller coaster located at Knight Valley, in OCT East in Shenzhen, Guangdong, China. The coaster was designed and manufactured by American wooden coaster designers Great Coasters International (GCI). It opened on July 19, 2011 as China's second wooden roller coaster. The coaster is notable for its use of the mountain terrain and two station fly-bys, and uses GCI's famous Millennium Flyer trains.

Awards

References 

Wooden roller coasters
Roller coasters in China